Charles Chapman (June 21, 1799 – August 7, 1869) was an American lawyer and politician who served a term as a U.S. Representative from Connecticut.

Born in Newtown, Connecticut, Chapman studied at the Litchfield Law School, where his father, Asa Chapman, had also studied. He was admitted to the bar in 1820 and commenced practice in New Haven, Connecticut, in 1827. He moved to Hartford in 1832 and became editor of the New England Review.

Chapman served as a member of the Connecticut House of Representatives in 1840, 1847, and 1848, representing Hartford, and as United States Attorney for the District of Connecticut from 1841 to 1848.

A supporter of Andrew Jackson's successful campaign for President in 1827–28, Chapman subsequently became a Conservative and later a Whig. In 1848 he ran unsuccessfully for election to the Thirty-first Congress. He was elected as a Whig to the Thirty-second Congress (March 4, 1851 – March 3, 1853).

He was an unsuccessful candidate for governor of Connecticut as a Temperance candidate in 1854.

Chapman was again elected to the Connecticut House of Representatives in 1862 and 1864, as a Democrat.

Chapman was married to Sarah Tomlinson. He died in Hartford, Connecticut, on August 7, 1869 and was interred in Cedar Hill Cemetery.

His son Charles R. Chapman served as mayor of Hartford and in both houses of the Connecticut legislature.

References

1799 births
1869 deaths
19th-century American politicians
Burials at Cedar Hill Cemetery (Hartford, Connecticut)
Connecticut lawyers
Litchfield Law School alumni
Democratic Party members of the Connecticut House of Representatives
People from Newtown, Connecticut
Politicians from Hartford, Connecticut
United States Attorneys for the District of Connecticut
Whig Party members of the United States House of Representatives from Connecticut
19th-century American lawyers